Ek Vivah Aisa Bhi is an Indian Hindi romance television series, which premiered on 6 February 2017 on &TV. The series is produced by The House of Originals of Nivedita Basu. The show was replaced by Half Marriage after the last episode aired on 22 September 2017.

Plot 
The story revolves around a young widow Suman. Suman is a caring mother, a responsible daughter-in-law and a loving sister-in-law. She balances between the household chores and her work in a local parlour every day to keep her family financially stable. She then joins a university to pursue an MBA course on her mother-in-law's insistence. 
There she meets a carefree Ranveer Mittal. Though they dislike each other initially, Ranveer later falls for Suman. Meanwhile, Latika's and Sanjana's (Suman's sister in laws) marriage gets fixed to the two brothers of Ranveer. Suman's mother-in-law accepts Ranveer's alliance to secure the future of her daughters. Suman, initially hesitant, latter accepts Ranveer. Suman and Ranveer get married with Suman's son Veer tying the "gat-bandhan".

There is a change in the behavior of Ranveer Mittal who becomes arrogant and refuses to accept Veer. Veer is thus kept back at his paternal home with his grand mother. It is later revealed that Suman's ex-husband, Ravi Parmar, who was known to be dead is actually alive. Suman and Veer are both forced to move in with him.

Ravi begins to physically abuse Suman. Ranveer arrives in time and saves Suman. Suman, Veer and Ranveer reconcile.

In the last scene it is shown that the whole family, including the pregnant daughter in laws( Suman, Sanjana and Antara), gather for a family photo.

Cast

Main 

 Sonali Nikam as Suman Ranveer Mittal, Ranveer's wife, Ravi's ex-wife and Veer's mother, Akash and Sindooraaa's daughter-in-law
 Abhishek Malik as Ranveer Akash Mittal, Suman's husband, Veer's adoptive father

Recurring 

 Pallas Prajapati as Veer Parmar Mittal, Suman and Ravi's son, Ranveer's adoptive son; Sindooraaa and Akash's adopted grandson
 Tasneem Sheikh as Sindooraaa Akash Mittal, Ranveer's mother, Suman's mother-in-law
 Rushil Bangia as Akash Mittal, Ranveer's father, Suman's fatherin-law
 Himani Shivpuri as Kalavati Parmar, Ravi's mother, Suman's ex mother-in-law
 Latika Gill as Antara Mittal, Manan's wife, Ravi's sister, Brijesh and Nupur's elder daughter in law
Kushagre Dua as Manan Brijesh Mittal, Ranveer's cousin brother, Antara's husband
 Sneha Gupta as Sanjana Mittal, Sahil's wife, Ravi's sister, Brijesh and Nupur's younger daughter in law
 Rupin Pahwa / Rehaan Roy as Sahil Brijesh Mittal, Ranveer's cousin brother, Sanjana's husband'
Shefali Rana as Nupur Brijesh Mittal, Sahil and Manan's mother, Ranveer's aunt, Sanjana and Antara's mother in law
 Nikhhil R Khera as Brijesh Mittal, Sahil and Manan's father, Ranveer's uncle, Sanjana and Antara's father-in-law
 Suneel Pushkarna as Devraj Mittal, Ranveer's uncle
 Annapurna B Bhairi as Suhasini Devraj Mittal, Devraj's wife
 Waseem Mushtaq as Ravi Parmar, Suman's first husband, Veer's father
 Shritama Mukherjee as Sonali, Ranveer's childhood friend and former love interest

References

External links 
Official Website

2017 Indian television series debuts
Hindi-language television shows
Indian television soap operas
Indian drama television series
Indian romance television series
Television shows set in Mumbai
&TV original programming
2017 Indian television series endings